George Patrick John Carew, 4th Baron Carew (1 February 1863 – 21 April 1926)

George Carew was the younger son of Robert Carew, 2nd Baron Carew, and his wife Emily Anne Philips, daughter of Sir George Richard Philips, 2nd Baronet. He was educated at Eton and Magdalene College, Cambridge.

He succeeded his elder brother Robert Carew, 3rd Baron Carew, to Baron Carew, a barony in the Peerage of Ireland and the Peerage of the United Kingdom on his brother's death in 1923.  As he had no children, the baronies passed to his cousin, Gerald Carew, 5th Baron Carew.

Notes

References 
Kidd, Charles & Williamson, David (eds.) (1990) Debrett's Peerage and Baronetage (1990 edition). New York: St Martin's Press, 

1863 births
1926 deaths
People educated at Eton College
Alumni of Magdalene College, Cambridge
George
Younger sons of barons